Milcov may refer to the following places in Romania:

 Milcovul, a commune in Vrancea County, Romania
 Milcov, Olt, a commune in Olt County, Romania
 Milcov (Siret), a river in Vrancea County 
 Milcov (Olt), a smaller river in Olt County